Saint Mary, Mother of God, previously known as St. Mary's German Catholic Church, was founded in 1845 by German immigrants and was dedicated in 1890 as a parish. It is in the Roman Catholic Archdiocese of Washington's northwest-east deanery, and is known for formerly celebrating the traditional Tridentine Mass.

Location 
Saint Mary, Mother of God Catholic Church is located at 727 Fifth Street, NW in Washington, DC near the Government Accountability Office Building, the National Building Museum, and Gallery Place Chinatown metro station.

History

Parish Priests 

Fr. Vincent DeRosa (2018-Present)
 Fr. Alfred J. Harris (2006–2018)
 George Glaab, DD (1891)
 Rev. Fr. Mathias Alig (1845)

Art and Music

Architecture 
The current building was designed by the Baltimore architectural firm of Baldwin & Pennington and erected in 1890-91.

Organ 
The organ in the church was made by George S. Hutchings of Boston and was installed in 1891.

References

External link
 Parish Website

Roman Catholic churches in Washington, D.C.